Doumergue may refer to:

François Doumergue (1858–1938), French naturalist
Doumergue's fringe-fingered lizard, a species of lizard in the family Lacertidae
Doumergue's skink, a species of skink in the family Scincidae
Gaston Doumergue (1863–1937), French politician and President of France

See also
 Domergue

Occitan-language surnames